Rainier Junior/Senior High School is a public school in Rainier, Oregon, United States that serves middle- and high school-aged students.

References

Public middle schools in Oregon
High schools in Columbia County, Oregon
Schools in Columbia County, Oregon
Public high schools in Oregon